Schoenorchis sarcophylla, commonly known as the fleshy flea orchid, is a small epiphytic orchid with many thin roots, between three and seven crowded, dark green leaves and up to thirty crowded, tube-shaped white flowers. It is found in New Guinea and tropical North Queensland.

Description
The petals are smaller than, and hidden by the sepals. Flowering occurs between August and September.

Taxonomy and naming
Schoenorchis sarcophylla was first formally described in 1913 by Rudolf Schlechter and the description was published in Repertorium specierum novarum regni vegetabilis. Beihefte. The specific epithet (sarcophylla) is derived from the ancient Greek words , genitive  (genitive ) meaning "flesh" and  meaning "leaf".

Distribution and habitat
It is found in New Guinea and in the Iron and McIlwraith Ranges in Queensland.

References

Orchids of New Guinea
Orchids of Queensland
Plants described in 1913
Aeridinae